Don't have a cow may refer to:

A catchphrase popularized by the character of Bart Simpson on American TV series The Simpsons
"Don't Have a Cow" (That's So Raven), an episode of American TV series That's So Raven